The 2021 season was Kedah Darul Aman's 13th season in the Malaysia Super League since the league's inception in 2004.

Management team

Players

Under-22s registered with first team

Transfers and contracts

Transfers in
Pre-season

Mid-season

Transfers out
Pre-season

Mid-season

Extension of contract

Retained

Friendlies
Pre-season

Mid-season

Competitions

Malaysia Super League

League table

Fixtures and results

Malaysia Cup

Group stage

The draw for the group stage was held on 15 September 2021.

Knockout stage

Quarter-finals

Johor Darul Ta'zim won 1–0 on aggregate.

AFC Cup

Group stage

Statistics

Appearances and goals
Players with no appearances not included in the list.

Notes

References 

Kedah Darul Aman F.C.
Kedah Darul Aman F.C. seasons
Kedah Darul Aman